Henry Suverkrup served in the California legislature and was born in Denmark.

References

Members of the California State Legislature
Year of birth missing